Wójcin  is a settlement, part of the village of Błotnica, in the administrative district of Gmina Kondratowice, within Strzelin County, Lower Silesian Voivodeship, in south-western Poland.

References

Villages in Strzelin County